Joseph Howard "Skip" Hinnant (born September 12, 1940) is an American actor, singer, voice actor and comedian.

Career 
Skip Hinnant's first major role was as Cathy's boyfriend, Ted, on The Patty Duke Show from 1963 to 1965. In 1967, he played Schroeder in the original off-Broadway cast of Clark Gesner's You're a Good Man, Charlie Brown, where his older brother, Bill Hinnant, played Snoopy.

Hinnant is best known as a featured performer on the children's show The Electric Company, which aired on the American educational television network PBS from 1971 to 1977. He was best known at that time as word decoder Fargo North, Decoder (a play on "Fargo, North Dakota") and as "The Boy" in the soap opera satire "Love of Chair."

Despite generally being known for acting in more family friendly works, Hinnant also performed in adult animation, providing the voice of Fritz the Cat in both the 1972 animated film of the same name and its 1974 sequel, The Nine Lives of Fritz the Cat.

In 1977, he voiced the Easter Bunny in the Rankin/Bass made-for-television, stop-motion animated feature The Easter Bunny Is Comin' To Town, and in 1980, he provided the voice for the title character Pogo Possum in the direct-to-video feature film I Go Pogo (also done in stop-motion). His most recent acting roles were an appearance in the PBS science education show 3-2-1 Contact as Flash Jordan in episode Measurement: How Fast? How Slow? on November 2, 1984 and a part in an episode of Kate & Allie as Bob Barsky's boss Brian Keyes in episode "I've Got a Secret" on February 27, 1989. Then he retired from television acting and devoted his entire career to voice-over work at beginnings of 1990s, but in 2006 he made appearances in two retrospectives of The Electric Company: one was a PBS pledge drive special, the other was The Best of the Electric Company: Vol. 2.

Hinnant is the longest-serving president of the New York branch of the Screen Actors Guild.

Filmography
 1963-1965 The Patty Duke Show as Ted 6 episodes 
 1966 The Plastic Dome of Norma Jean as Francis
 1971-1977 The Electric Company as Jay Jay and Various characters (most notably Fargo North, Decoder)
 1972 Fritz the Cat as Fritz the Cat (voice)
 1974 The Nine Lives of Fritz the Cat as Fritz the Cat (voice)
 1977 The Easter Bunny Is Comin' to Town as Sunny the Easter Bunny
 1980 I Go Pogo as Pogo Possum
 1984 3-2-1 Contact as Flash Jordan 1 episode 
 1986 My Little Pony and Friends as Various voices 
 1988 As the World Turns as Mr. Leversee 1 episode 
 1989 Kate & Allie as Brian Keyes 1 episode 
 1990 Alexander and the Terrible, Horrible, No Good, Very Bad Day as Shoe Salesman

References

External links

1940 births
1940s births
Living people
Male actors from Virginia
American male comedians
American male voice actors
American male television actors
American male film actors
American sketch comedians
People from Chincoteague, Virginia
Male actors from Los Angeles
Comedians from California